Fujiwara no Akihira (藤原 明衡; 989? – November 14, 1066) was a Japanese nobleman and kanshi poet of the Heian period.

Life 
Fujiwara no Akihira was the second child of Fujiwara no Atsunobu. He was probably born around 989.

According to the Chokusen Sakusha Burui (勅撰作者部類), he died on the 18th day of the tenth month in Jiryaku 2 (November 14, 1066). In his article on Akihira for the Nihon Koten Bungaku Daijiten,  suggests that he may have been 78 (by Japanese reckoning) at the time of his death.

Poetry

References

Citations

Works cited 

 
 
 

Kanshi poets
11th-century Japanese poets
Kuge
980s births
1066 deaths